Ana Ugrinovska (born May 18, 1980) is a Macedonian slalom canoer who competed from the mid-1990s to the early 2000s. She finished 29th in the K-1 event at the 1996 Summer Olympics in Atlanta.

References
Sports-Reference.com profile

1980 births
Canoeists at the 1996 Summer Olympics
Living people
Macedonian female canoeists
Olympic canoeists of North Macedonia
Place of birth missing (living people)